Colin Perry (1916 – 28 November 1942) was an English professional footballer who played three games and scored two goals for Nottingham Forest in the 1939–40 season before competitive football was suspended due to the outbreak of the Second World War.

He died during the Second World War during the Siege of Tobruk when serving as a driver in the Royal Army Service Corps.

References

1916 births
1942 deaths
British Army personnel killed in World War II
People from Kiveton Park
English footballers
Association football wingers
Kiveton Park F.C. players
Sheffield United F.C. players
Gainsborough Trinity F.C. players
Aston Villa F.C. players
Nottingham Forest F.C. players
English Football League players
Royal Army Service Corps soldiers
Military personnel from Yorkshire